The 1992 Bristol City Council election took place on 7 May 1992 to elect members of Bristol City Council in England. This was on the same day as other local elections. One third of seats were up for election. Two seats were contested in Hartcliffe due to an extra vacancy occurring. The elections were held just weeks after John Major's unexpected 1992 General election victory, and mirroring that result there was a strong swing from Labour to Conservative.

Ward results

The change is calculated using the results when these actual seats were last contested, i.e. the 1988 election.

Avonmouth

Bishopston

Bishopsworth

Brislington East

Brislington West

Clifton

Cotham

Hartcliffe

Henbury

Hengrove

Henleaze

Horfield

Kingsweston

Knowle

Redland

Southmead

St George East

St George West

Stockwood

Stoke Bishop

Westbury-on-Trym

Whitchurch Park

Windmill Hill

Sources
 Bristol Evening Post 8 May 1992

1992
1992 English local elections
1990s in Bristol